This list of geography awards is an index to articles about notable awards for geography, the field of science devoted to the study of the lands, features, inhabitants, and phenomena of the Earth and planets. The list is organized by the region and country of the organization who gives the award. Awards are not necessarily limited to people from the award-giver's country.

Canada

Europe

United Kingdom

United States

India

See also

 Lists of awards
 Lists of science and technology awards

References

Sources

 
Geography